Fairview Township is a township in Butler County, Pennsylvania, United States. The population was 2,080 at the 2010 census.

Geography
Fairview Township is located along the eastern edge of Butler County, with Armstrong County to the east. It surrounds the boroughs of Fairview, Petrolia, and Karns City but is separate from them.

Demographics

As of the census of 2000, there were 2,061 people, 744 households, and 578 families living in the township.  The population density was 85.6 people per square mile (33.1/km2).  There were 775 housing units at an average density of 32.2/sq mi (12.4/km2).  The racial makeup of the township was 99.47% White, 0.19% African American, 0.10% Native American, 0.10% Asian, and 0.15% from two or more races. Hispanic or Latino of any race were 0.19% of the population.

There were 744 households, out of which 36.8% had children under the age of 18 living with them, 67.1% were married couples living together, 7.1% had a female householder with no husband present, and 22.3% were non-families. 18.5% of all households were made up of individuals, and 9.1% had someone living alone who was 65 years of age or older.  The average household size was 2.77 and the average family size was 3.18.

In the township the population was spread out, with 26.3% under the age of 18, 7.2% from 18 to 24, 30.5% from 25 to 44, 22.9% from 45 to 64, and 13.1% who were 65 years of age or older.  The median age was 37 years. For every 100 females there were 97.6 males.  For every 100 females age 18 and over, there were 96.1 males.

The median income for a household in the township was $41,146, and the median income for a family was $47,262. Males had a median income of $36,615 versus $22,222 for females. The per capita income for the township was $16,295.  About 8.9% of families and 9.0% of the population were below the poverty line, including 8.8% of those under age 18 and 11.5% of those age 65 or over.

Education
Karns City Area School District - public school
Karns City High School

References

External links
Early history of Fairview Township

Populated places established in 1795
Townships in Butler County, Pennsylvania